Carmichaelia nana  is a species of plant in the family Fabaceae. It is found in both the North and South Islands of New Zealand. Its conservation status in 2013 was assessed as "At Risk (declinining)" under the New Zealand Threat Classification System, but in 2018 its risk under the same system became "Threatened-Nationally Vulnerable".

Description 
Carmichaelia nana  is a dwarf, spreading shrub growing in a dense mat  from 20 to 60 mm high and 0.5 m wide.

Taxonomy
The species was first described by George Bentham as C. australis var. β nana. It was raised to species level by William Colenso in 1864 in Joseph Dalton Hooker's "Handbook of New Zealand Flora". The species epithet, nana, is a Latin adjective meaning "diminutive" or "dwarfed".

Habitat
It is found from both lowland to alpine habitats in alluvial river beds, terraces, and moraines.

References

External links
Carmichaelia nana occurrence data from Australasian Virtual Herbarium 

nana
Flora of New Zealand
Taxa named by Joseph Dalton Hooker
Plants described in 1880